William Hind (April 1885 – 30 January 1963) was an English professional footballer who made over 190 appearances as a right half in the Football League for Clapton Orient. He also played league football for Fulham. After his retirement as a player, Hind served Ton Pentre as trainer and returned to Clapton Orient as assistant trainer.

Personal life 
Prior to becoming a professional footballer, Hind worked as a plasterer. He served as a gunner in the British Army during the First World War.

Honours 
Clapton Orient

London Challenge Cup: 1911–12

Career statistics

References

English footballers
English Football League players
Leyton Orient F.C. players
British Army personnel of World War I
Association football wing halves
1885 births
1963 deaths
Association football fullbacks
People from Percy Main
Footballers from Tyne and Wear
Willington Athletic F.C. players
Fulham F.C. players
Leyton Orient F.C. non-playing staff
Royal Artillery soldiers